The Hoover–Minthorn House is a museum in Newberg, Oregon, United States, created from the residence of Herbert Hoover, thirty-first President of the United States. Hoover lived there from 1885 to 1891, with his uncle and aunt John and Laura Minthorn. The Minthorns were administrators of the Quaker school Friends Pacific Academy, now George Fox University, which Hoover and his brother Tad attended.

The house, an Italianate design built in 1881 by Jesse Edwards, a Quaker merchant, is the first residence Edwards built and the oldest house still standing in what is now Newberg, Oregon.  Representing vernacular design in the Willamette Valley, it was restored and opened to the public in 1955. It is located on 115 South River Street.  Owned and operated as a house museum by the Oregon chapter of The National Society of the Colonial Dames of America, it has been furnished with late 19th-century period furnishings, including the bedroom furniture used by Hoover as a boy.

The house was placed on the National Register of Historic Places (as the Dr. Henry J. Minthorn House aka Herbert Hoover House) in 2003.

References

External links
Hoover-Minthorn House
Official Website
Facebook Page

Museums in Yamhill County, Oregon
Buildings and structures in Newberg, Oregon
Historic house museums in Oregon
National Register of Historic Places in Yamhill County, Oregon
Presidential homes in the United States
Presidential museums in the United States
Biographical museums in Oregon
Hoover family residences
Houses on the National Register of Historic Places in Oregon
1881 establishments in Oregon
Houses in Yamhill County, Oregon
National Society of the Colonial Dames of America